Inborn errors of immunity (IEI) are genetic mutations that result in an increased susceptibility to infectious disease, autoinflammatory disease, allergy, or autoimmunity. Inborn errors include, but are not limited to, primary immunodeficiencies. As of 2020, there are 431 identified inborn errors of immunity.

Types
As of 2020, there are 431 IEIs, which are divided into three categories:
Primary immunodeficiencies
Mendelian infections
Monogenic infections

Causes
A variety of mutations can cause inborn errors of immunity. These include loss of function, gain of function, and loss of expression.

Epidemiology
IEIs were historically considered very rare, affecting only 1 in 10,000 – 50,000 births. As more IEIs are described and clinical phenotypes are defined more precisely, their true prevalence may be more common. More recent estimates place prevalence at 1 in 1,000 – 10,000 births.

History
The first human IEI described was epidermodysplasia verruciformis in 1946, with the first primary immunodeficiency (X-linked agammaglobulinemia) described in 1952.

In 1973, the World Health Organization (WHO) established the Inborn Errors of Immunity Committee for the purpose of classifying and identifying immune defects in humans. In the 1990s, the WHO decided to focus on more common disease, and the committee was taken on by the International Union of Immunological Societies. This relationship was made official in 2008.

See also
List of primary immunodeficiencies

References

Medical genetics
Immune system disorders